The coat of arms of Bournemouth was first granted on 24 March 1891. The crest (above the shield) consists of four English roses surmounted by a pine tree. The motto (below the shield) is Pulchritudo et Salubritas, Latin for "beauty and health". The colours of the shield, the main part of the coat of arms, are taken from the royal arms of King Edward the Confessor, in whose royal estate the area now known as Bournemouth was situated. The four salmon represent those to be found in the River Stour, which marks the boundary between Christchurch and Bournemouth. Each of the lions holds a rose between ts paws. The six birds, also taken from Edward the Confessor's arms, are martlets, heraldic birds with no legs (based on the folk belief that swallows never stopped flying and so did not need legs). The roses in the arms are emblems both of England and of Hampshire, which Bournemouth historically belonged to.

References 

1891 establishments in England
Coats of arms with lions
Municipal coats of arms in Dorset
Coats of arms with fish
Coats of arms with birds
Coats of arms with roses
Bournemouth